Cleugh Passage is a strait of the Bay of Bengal in the Andaman Islands, part of the Indian union territory of Andaman and Nicobar Islands. It lies at the north tip of North Andaman Island (Cape Price), and separates it from the smaller islands Landfall Island and East Island. It is about 5 km wide. West Island lies in the western approach to the passage.

References 

 Geological Survey of India

Landforms of the Andaman and Nicobar Islands
North and Middle Andaman district